Antonios "Antonis" Vlontakis (born 10 October 1975) is a retired Greek water polo player. A long-standing member of the Greece national water polo team, Vlontakis competed in the 2000 Summer Olympics (10th place), the 2004 Summer Olympics (4th place), and the 2008 Summer Olympics (7th place). He was part of the Greece men's national water polo team that won the Bronze Medal in the 2005 World Championship in Montreal and the Bronze Medal in the 2004 World League in Long Beach.

Vlontakis started his career at NO Chania and in 1997 he moved to Olympiacos where he had a successful career (1997–2002, 2009–2011), winning 1 LEN Champions League (2002), 5 Greek Championships (1999, 2000, 2001, 2002, 2010), 4 Greek Cups (1998, 2001, 2002, 2010) and 2 Greek Supercups (1997, 1998). He was a key player of the Olympiacos team that won the 2002 Triple Crown (LEN Champions League, Greek Championship, Greek Cup).

Honours

Club
Ethnikos
 Greek Championship (1): 2006
 Greek Cup (1): 2005
Olympiacos
 LEN Champions League (1): 2001–02
 Greek Championship (5): 1999, 2000, 2001, 2002, 2010
 Greek Cup (4): 1998, 2001, 2002, 2010
 Greek Super Cup (2): 1997, 1998

National team
  Bronze Medal in 2005 World Championship, Montreal
  Bronze Medal in 2004 World League, Long Beach
 4th place in 2004 Olympic Games, Athens
 4th place in 2003 World Championship, Barcelona

See also
 List of World Aquatics Championships medalists in water polo

References

 interview at pisina.net (in Greek)

External links
 

1975 births
Living people
Greek male water polo players
Olympiacos Water Polo Club players
Olympic water polo players of Greece
Water polo players at the 2000 Summer Olympics
Water polo players at the 2004 Summer Olympics
Water polo players at the 2008 Summer Olympics
Ethnikos WPC
World Aquatics Championships medalists in water polo

Ethnikos Piraeus Water Polo Club players